Beneath the Dark is a 2010 American mystery-thriller film directed by Chad Feehan, and starring Josh Stewart, Jamie-Lynn Sigler and Chris Browning.

It was originally titled Wake and was inspired by the novel The Shining.

Plot
Driving to a wedding in Los Angeles through the Mojave desert, Paul and Adrienne pull off the highway and into Roy's Motel and Café. This roadside rest stop proves to be a strange and surreal place with an unsettling mix of travelers, who force the couple to discover a hidden secret.

Cast

Release
The film was previewed at the South by Southwest film festival on March 13, 2010.  It was released as direct-to-video in multiple regions throughout 2010 and 2011, but was also made available in theaters in Australia on October 31, 2011.

Reception
The New York Times reviewed the film as "Airless, tortuous and broody to a fault", explaining that "there are lots of reasons why horror filmmakers keep checking their characters into seedy motels... but not even the Bates Motel itself could save the mess that is 'Beneath the Dark.'"

The Hollywood Reporter noted that it was "defeated by the convoluted story line, sluggish pacing and a general 'been there, seen that' feeling induced by the proceedings. Although boasting strongly atmospheric visuals and effective performances, [it] never rises above a general level of murkiness."

References

External links
 
 Beneath the Dark on IFC Films website
 
 

2010 films
2010 horror films
2010s mystery thriller films
American mystery thriller films
Films shot in California
2010s English-language films
2010s American films